Līga Liepiņa (born August 1, 1946) is a Latvian actress.

Biography 
Liepiņa was born in Naukšēni. Her father was a forest worker, her mother worked in a kindergarten. She finished school in 1964, the People's studio of the actor at the Riga Cinema studio in 1970 and the faculty of theatre at the Latvian Music Academy in 1974.

After her studies, Liepiņa was part of the group of the State Theater of the Youth from 1971 to 1976. Since 1977 she was an actress at the National Theatre of Latvia.

Films 
Her first film was Four White Shirts (Elpojiet dzili or Cetri balti krekli) directed by Rolands Kalniņš, from 1967. There she had the role of Bella. However, the film was forbidden by Soviet censorship. Liepiņa became famous by playing the role of Emma Karkls in the film U bogatoj gospozhi ("У богатой госпожи") by Leonīds Leimanis in 1969 after a novel by Andrejs Upīts. She had roles in more than 20 films.

Liepiņa is a part of the National Theatre of Latvia until now.

References

Web sources 
 Биография Лиги Лиепини на сайте kino-teatr.ru Biography of Liepina, in Russian

1946 births
Living people
Latvian stage actresses
Latvian film actresses
20th-century Latvian actresses
People from Naukšēni Municipality